Carex wenshanensis is a species of sedge native to China.

References 

wenshanensis
Flora of China